Back Home is a 1989 British-American made-for-television drama film based on Michelle Magorian's novel of the same name. Directed by Piers Haggard, the film starred Hayley Mills, Hayley Carr, Brenda Bruce and Jean Anderson and was broadcast on ITV on 23 July 1989. It was first shown in the United States on the Disney Channel on June 7, 1990.

Plot 
Virginia 'Rusty' Dickinson (Hayley Carr) left England during World War II, and comes back home in 1945. During the war she lived in a foster family and in this way absorbed American culture.

She discovers that her family's situation is very different than it was before the war. She meets her mother, Peggy Dickinson (Hayley Mills), and her new five-year-old brother, Charlie. As Rusty returns, her father, Roger Dickinson (Rupert Frazer), is still stationed as a soldier in Burma. When Japan surrenders he comes back home. His old-fashioned behavior and nature make him unhappy with his modern self-sufficient wife, his Americanised daughter and especially Charlie's dislike of his "new" father.

Rusty is sent to boarding school. As she is used to an American school, she finds the teachers and the other pupils very strict. The school's atmosphere makes her suffer and the other pupils mock her for being an American.

Cast 
Hayley Mills as Mrs. Peggy Dickinson
Hayley Carr as Virginia "Rusty" Dickinson
Adam Stevenson as Charles "Charlie" Dickinson
Brenda Bruce as The Honourable Lady Beatrice "Beattie" Langley
Jean Anderson as Grandmother Dickinson
Rupert Frazer as Mr. Roger Dickinson
Mary Ellen Ray as Aunt Hannah
Tracy Johns as School Child

References

External links

1989 television films
1989 films
1989 drama films
Disney Channel original films
Films directed by Piers Haggard
Television shows produced by Television South (TVS)
American drama television films
1980s English-language films
1980s American films
1980s British films
British drama television films